The Nokia 7900 is a mobile phone produced by Nokia and announced on August 7, 2007. It is part of Nokia's Prism Collection. It runs S40 5th Edition. It is a quadband phone and has WCDMA on 850 MHz and 2100 MHz. The  screen is powered by OLED technology, Nokia's first, and has a resolution of 320x240 pixels showing 16 million colors. Included is a 2-megapixel camera with flash, an 850mAh battery, and 1 GB of on board memory.

Dimensions are as follows: 112 x 45 x 11.3 mm; 101 grams.

There is a Nokia 7900 Crystal Prism, which has the same features, but the material of the casing is different.

References

Information Source

7900
Mobile phones introduced in 2007
Mobile phones with user-replaceable battery